Tyukan is a rural locality (a station) in Rabochy posyolok Bureya of Bureysky District, Amur Oblast, Russia. The population was 6 as of 2018. There is 1 street.

Geography 
The village is located in the valley of the Sredny Tyukan River, 22 km west from Bureya.

References 

Rural localities in Bureysky District